Kupil is a village (selo) in Khmelnytskyi Raion (district) of Khmelnytskyi Oblast (province) of western Ukraine. It belongs to Viitivtsi settlement hromada, one of the hromadas of Ukraine.

Until 18 July 2020, Kupil belonged to Volochysk Raion. The raion was abolished in July 2020 as part of the administrative reform of Ukraine, which reduced the number of raions of Khmelnytskyi Oblast to three. The area of Volochysk Raion was merged into Khmelnytskyi Raion.

Jewish History 
Jewish settlement in Kupel began in the 18th century. In 1897 the local Jewish population comprised 63 percent of the total population. After the October Revolution Jews suffered from pogroms, most severely on December 5–10, 1917.

The Germans occupied the town on July 5, 1941. During the first days the Germans murdered about 90 Jewish men. Jews were kept imprisoned in a ghetto and used to perform forced labor. On September 21, 1942, about 600 Jews from Kupel were taken to Volochisk and executed outside the town. The remaining Jews, those who had been found in hiding, were shot to death at the town's Jewish cemetery. Kupel was liberated by the Red Army in March 1944.

The Hebrew scholar William Chomsky was born in Kupil in 1896. He later moved to United States. William is the father to Noam Chomsky and David.

The Yiddish writer Chaim Bejder was born in Kupil (Kupel) in 1920. He was an editor of the only Jewish magazine in the Soviet Union, Sovetish Geimland. He moved to the United States in 1996 and died in the state of New York in 2003.

External links
 Jews of Kupel the Shtetl. Life in Kupel before World War II and fate of Kupel Jews in documents, maps, photographs and stories  at http://kupel.net/

References 

Starokonstantinovsky Uyezd
Shtetls
Jewish Ukrainian history
Holocaust locations in Ukraine
Villages in Khmelnytskyi Raion